Mohammed Aman Geleto (Amharic: መሀመድ አማን; born 10 January 1994) is an Ethiopian middle-distance runner. Born in Asella, he is the winner of the 800-meter final at the 2013 World Athletics Championships in the Luzhniki stadium in Moscow. Aman also won consecutive 800 m titles at the 2009 and 2011 African Junior Athletics Championships.

Running career
Aman was the inaugural winner of the 1000 metres race at the 2010 Youth Olympics in Singapore. He won a silver medal in the 800 m at the 2011 World Youth Championships in Athletics, coming in secong behind Leonard Kirwa Kosencha who set a world youth record. He ran an Ethiopian record to win his semi-final heat at the 2011 World Championships in Athletics, but finished last in the event final.

In September he improved his Ethiopian record to 1:43.37 minutes (establishing the world youth best that remains today) behind David Rudisha at the Rieti Meeting, then ended Rudisha's 34-meet winning streak at the Notturna di Milano, beating him by seven hundredths of a second in a time of 1:43.50 minutes.

He won 800 m final in the 2012 IAAF World Indoor Championships in Istanbul as the youngest gold medalist athlete.

He finished 6th in the 800 metres at the 2017 World Championships held in London.

Competition record

Personal best

References

External links
 
 
 
 
 

 

1994 births
Living people
Ethiopian male middle-distance runners
Athletes (track and field) at the 2010 Summer Youth Olympics
Sportspeople from Oromia Region
Olympic athletes of Ethiopia
Athletes (track and field) at the 2012 Summer Olympics
Athletes (track and field) at the 2016 Summer Olympics
World Athletics Championships athletes for Ethiopia
World Athletics Championships medalists
Diamond League winners
World Athletics Indoor Championships winners
World Athletics Championships winners
Youth Olympic gold medalists for Ethiopia
Youth Olympic gold medalists in athletics (track and field)